Knipp is a German and Dutch surname. Notable people with the surname include:

Chuck Knipp (born 1961), Canadian-American comedian 
Russell Knipp (1942–2006), American weightlifter

See also
 Knipping

German-language surnames
Dutch-language surnames
Occupational surnames